Brian Norwood (born August 12, 1965) is an American football coach. He currently serves as defensive backs coach, assistant head coach, and defensive passing game coordinator at UCLA. Prior to that, he most recently was the co-defensive coordinator and safeties coach with Navy Midshipmen football. Previously, Norwood served as co-defensive coordinator and safeties coach with Bill Snyder at Kansas State Wildcats football and Philip Montgomery at Tulsa Golden Hurricane football. This was after holding the position of assistant head coach to Art Briles at Baylor University. Both Norwood and Briles served as assistants to Mike Leach at Texas Tech in 2000. Norwood was also an assistant to Joe Paterno at Penn State from 2001 to 2007.

Norwood grew up in Prince George's County, Maryland, where he attended Georgetown University basketball camps and met then-coach John Thompson. With his father serving in the Air Force, his family moved to Hawaii in Norwood's sophomore year of high school. Norwood played cornerback and safety at the University of Hawaii and graduated with a bachelor's degree in communication in 1988. In high school and college, he was best friends with Ken Niumatalolo, now the head coach who hired him at Navy. After college, Norwood worked for United Airlines for a year before playing football the Canadian Football League with the Calgary Stampeders. His football playing career came to an end when he was diagnosed with diabetes.

Family
Norwood and his wife, Tiffiney, met and started dating in high school in Hawaii. They have five children: Gabe, Jordan, Levi, Brianna and Zac.

Norwood's son Gabe, was a member of the George Mason Patriots men's basketball team that advanced to the 2006 NCAA Final Four. He is currently playing for the Rain or Shine Elasto Painters in the Philippine Basketball Association and a current member of the Philippine national basketball team. His second son, Jordan, played wide receiver at Penn State and was a wide receiver for the Denver Broncos. His third son, Levi, was a receiver for Baylor University. His only daughter, Brianna, attended George Mason University, where she studied sports management and was on the dance team. Brianna worked for the Washington Nationals during the 2012, 2013 and 2014 seasons, meeting Nationals center fielder Michael A. Taylor, now her fiancé. His youngest son, Zac, played basketball for Midway High School in Waco, Texas.

References

External links
 Baylor profile 

1965 births
Living people
American football defensive backs
Canadian football defensive backs
Arizona Wildcats football coaches
Baylor Bears football coaches
Calgary Stampeders players
Hawaii Rainbow Warriors football players
Kansas State Wildcats football coaches
Navy Midshipmen football coaches
Penn State Nittany Lions football coaches
Richmond Spiders football coaches
Texas Tech Red Raiders football coaches
Tulsa Golden Hurricane football coaches
Sportspeople from Portsmouth, Virginia
African-American coaches of American football
African-American players of Canadian football
African-American players of American football
Admiral Arthur W. Radford High School alumni
UCLA Bruins football coaches
21st-century African-American people
20th-century African-American sportspeople